This is a list of 2001 British incumbents.

Government
 Monarch
 Head of State – Elizabeth II, Queen of the United Kingdom (1952–2022)
 Prime Minister
 Head of Government – Tony Blair, Prime Minister of the United Kingdom (1997–2007)
Deputy Prime Minister
 Deputy Head of Government – John Prescott, Deputy Prime Minister of the United Kingdom (1997–2007)
First Secretary of State
 John Prescott, First Secretary of State (1997–2007)
First Lord of the Treasury
 Tony Blair, First Lord of the Treasury (1997–2007)
Minister for the Civil Service
 Tony Blair, Minister for the Civil Service (1997–2007)
Chancellor of the Exchequer
 Gordon Brown, Chancellor of the Exchequer (1997–2007)
Second Lord of the Treasury
 Gordon Brown, Second Lord of the Treasury (1997–2007)
Secretary of State for Foreign and Commonwealth Affairs
 Robin Cook, Secretary of State for Foreign and Commonwealth Affairs (1997–2001)
 Jack Straw, Secretary of State for Foreign and Commonwealth Affairs (2001–2007)
Secretary of State for the Home Department
 Jack Straw, Secretary of State for the Home Department (1997–2001)
 David Blunkett, Secretary of State for the Home Department (2001–2007)
Minister of Agriculture, Fisheries and Food
 Nick Brown, Minister of Agriculture, Fisheries and Food (1998–2001)
 Taken over by Secretary of State for Environment, Food and Rural Affairs
Secretary of State for Environment, Food and Rural Affairs
 Margaret Beckett, Secretary of State for Environment, Food and Rural Affairs (2001–2007)
Secretary of State for Environment, Transport and the Regions
 John Prescott, Secretary of State for Environment, Transport and the Regions (1999–2001)
 Stephen Byers, Secretary of State for Transport (2001–2002)
Secretary of State for Scotland
 John Reid, Secretary of State for Scotland (1999–2001)
 Helen Liddell, Secretary of State for Scotland (2001–2003)
Secretary of State for Health
 Alan Milburn, Secretary of State for Health (1999–2003)
Secretary of State for Northern Ireland
 Peter Mandelson, Secretary of State for Northern Ireland (1999–2001)
 John Reid, Secretary of State for Northern Ireland (2001–2002)
Secretary of State for Defence
 Geoff Hoon, Secretary of State for Defence (1999–2007)
Secretary of State for Trade and Industry
 Stephen Byers, Secretary of State for Trade and Industry (1998–2001)
 Patricia Hewitt, Secretary of State for Trade and Industry (2001–2007)
Minister for Women and Equality
 Patricia Hewitt, Minister for Women and Equality (2001–2007)
Secretary of State for Culture, Media and Sport
 Chris Smith, Secretary of State for Culture, Media and Sport (1997–2001)
 Tessa Jowell, Secretary of State for Culture, Media and Sport (2001–2007)
 Secretary of State for Education and Skills
 David Blunkett, Secretary of State for Education and Employment (1997–2001)
 Estelle Morris, Secretary of State for Education and Skills (2001–2007)
Secretary of State for Wales
 Paul Murphy, Secretary of State for Wales (1999–2002)
Lord Privy Seal
 Margaret Jay, Baroness Jay of Paddington, Lord Privy Seal (1998–2001)
 Gareth Wyn Williams, Baron Williams of Mostyn, Lord Privy Seal (2001–2003)
Leader of the House of Commons
 Margaret Beckett, Leader of the House of Commons (1998–2001)
 Robin Cook, Leader of the House of Commons (2001–2007)
Lord President of the Council
 Margaret Beckett, Lord President of the Council (1998–2001)
 Robin Cook, Lord President of the Council (2001–2003)
Lord Chancellor
 Derry Irvine, Baron Irvine of Lairg, Lord Chancellor (1997–2003)
Secretary of State for International Development
 Clare Short, Secretary of State for International Development (1997–2003)
Secretary of State for Work and Pensions
 Alistair Darling, Secretary of State for Social Security (1998–2001)
 Alistair Darling, Secretary of State for Work and Pensions (2001–2002)
Chancellor of the Duchy of Lancaster
 Mo Mowlam, Chancellor of the Duchy of Lancaster (1999–2001)
 Lord Macdonald of Tradeston, Chancellor of the Duchy of Lancaster (2001–2003)

Religion
 Archbishop of Canterbury
George Carey, Archbishop of Canterbury (1991–2002)
 Archbishop of York
 David Hope, Archbishop of York (1995–2005)

Devolved Administrations

First Minister of Scotland
Henry McLeish (2000–2001)
Jack McConnell (2001–)
Deputy First Minister of Scotland
Jim Wallace (1999–)
First Minister of Wales
Rhodri Morgan (2000–)
Deputy First Minister of Wales
Michael German (2000 – July 2001)
Jenny Randerson (acting 2001–)

Leaders
2001
British incumbents